The Harrison Creek flows into the Grass River in Pyrites, New York.

References 

Rivers of St. Lawrence County, New York